The Massachusetts Executive Office of Energy and Environmental Affairs (EOEEA) is a Cabinet level agency under the Governor of Massachusetts. EOEEA is responsible for promoting efficient energy use throughout the Commonwealth while protecting and preserving Massachusetts' natural environment.

The agency is under the supervision and control of the Secretary of Energy and Environmental Affairs, who is appointed by the Governor.

Leadership
The current Secretary of Energy and Environmental Affairs is Kathleen Theoharides, who was appointed by Governor Charlie Baker. Former Secretaries have included Rick Sullivan and Ian Bowles.

Constituent departments
The office is composed of several constituent departments, which are responsible for the administration of the office's work. Each department is headed by a director, who is appointed by the governor.

 Office of the Secretary
 Department of Environmental Protection
 Department of Fish and Game
 Department of Agricultural Resources
 Department of  Conservation and Recreation
 Department of Public Utilities
 Department of Energy Resources
 Office of Law Enforcement, more commonly known as the Massachusetts Environmental Police
 Massachusetts Office of Technical Assistance

See also
List of State Fish and Wildlife Management Agencies in the U.S.

References

External links
 
 Organizational structure of the EEA
 Massachusetts ACEC Program
 Department of Agricultural Resources.
 Department of Conservation and Recreation.
 Department of Environmental Protection.
 Department of Energy Resources.
 Department of Fish and Game.
 Department of Public Utilities.
 Massachusetts Environmental Police.
 . (Various documents).

Energy
Massachusetts